is a Japanese anime director.

Anime involved with
Akame ga Kill!: Director, Storyboard (eps 1, 24), Episode Director (eps 1, 24)
Amagami SS+ plus: Director, Storyboard (ep 3)
Futakoi Alternative: Episode Director (ep 4)
Galaxy Angel A: Unit Director
Galaxy Angel Z: Storyboard, Unit Director
Hundred: Director
Infinite Dendrogram: Director
Pretear: Storyboard (ep 11)
Remake Our Life!: Director
Rozen Maiden: Director (ep 5)
Seiren: Director
Seven of Seven: Episode Director, Dramatization
Sola: Director
Steins;Gate: Episode Director (9,15)
Steins;Gate: Egoistic Poriomania" Director
Strawberry 100% (OVA): Director
Takunomi.: Director
Tears to Tiara: Director
The Daichis - Earth Defence Family: Episode Director (ep 5)
Utawarerumono: Director, Storyboard (ep 1,15,18)

References

External links

Anime directors
Living people
1969 births
People from Aichi Prefecture